La Vacquerie-et-Saint-Martin-de-Castries is a commune in the Hérault department in the Occitanie region
in southern France.

Population

See also
Communes of the Hérault department

References

Communes of Hérault